ISO 3166-2:IR is the entry for the Islamic Republic of Iran in ISO 3166-2, part of the ISO 3166 standard published by the International Organization for Standardization (ISO), which defines codes for the names of the principal subdivisions (e.g., provinces or states) of all countries coded in ISO 3166-1.

Currently for Iran, ISO 3166-2 codes are defined for 31 provinces.

Each code consists of two parts, separated by a hyphen. The second part is two digits.

Current codes
Subdivision names are listed as in the ISO 3166-2 standard published by the ISO 3166 Maintenance Agency (ISO 3166/MA).

Click on the button in the header to sort each column.

Changes
The following changes to the entry have been announced in newsletters by the ISO 3166/MA since the first publication of ISO 3166-2 in 1998. ISO stopped issuing newsletters in 2013.

The following changes to the entry are listed on ISO's online catalogue, the Online Browsing Platform:

See also
 Subdivisions of Iran
 FIPS region codes of Iran

External links
 ISO Online Browsing Platform: IR
 Provinces of Iran, Statoids.com

2:IR
ISO 3166-2
Iran geography-related lists